The 1926 German Grand Prix was an auto race held at the AVUS track on 11 July 1926. It was the first ever German Grand Prix. The race was held in heavy rain, and was won by Germany's native son, Rudolf Caracciola.

Recognising a lack of available vehicles for the new Grand Prix formula (for example, the 1926 French Grand Prix had just three starters), the organisers decided to admit a diverse field vaguely described as sports cars. These were divided into three classes based on engine capacity: Class D (2L-3L), Class E (1.5L-2L) and Class F (1.1L to 1.5L). The race start was staggered, with class D released first, followed by class E, and finally class F, at 2-minute intervals. 

The race was marred by an accident involving driver Adolf Rosenberger, whose car crashed into one of the marshals' huts, killing three people.

The German Grand Prix would not return to the AVUS track until 1959.

Classification

References

German Grand Prix
1926 in Grand Prix racing
1926 in German motorsport